Ish may refer to:
Ish (name) also ancient Hebrew word for Man at Genesis 2:23, also Ish-shah for Woman
Chazon Ish, sobriquet of Rabbi Avraham Yeshayahu Karelitz
the Sanskrit for "lord", see Ishvara
...ish (audio drama), Doctor Who audio drama
Ish, a book by Peter H. Reynolds
Kollel Chazon Ish, a group of married rabbis who study the Talmud

Places
Ish-Blloku, an upmarket area in Tirana, Albania
Nowabad-e Ish, a village in north-eastern Afghanistan

Arts
...ish (album), a 1989 album by the Australian rock band 1927
A compilation album released by Some Bizzare

Abbreviations
International Students House, London
International Student House of Washington, D.C.
In situ hybridization
Institut für Seefischerei, Hamburg (international museum abbreviation)
International School of Helsinki
International School of Hamburg
International School of The Hague
International School of Havana
International School of Hyderabad
Intrastructural help
Irish Sport Horse
Isolated systolic hypertension